Marudakkudi is a village in the Thanjavur taluk of Thanjavur district, Tamil Nadu, India.

Demographics 

As per the 2001 census, Marudakkudi had a total population of 2010 with 1017 males and 993 females. The sex ratio was 976. The literacy rate was 74.41.

References 

 

Villages in Thanjavur district